Marianne von der Leyen und zu Hohengeroldseck (1746–1804), was a German countess from the House of Leyen, who served as regent of the County of Hohengeroldseck.

Early life
Maria Anna Helene Josepha Marianne was born as the second child and only daughter of Baron Franz Heinrich Kämmerer von Worms genannt von Dalberg (1716-1776) and Countess Maria Sophia Anna von und zu Eltz-Kempenich (1722-1763). Her older brother was Karl Theodor Anton Maria von Dalberg, while her younger brother was Wolfgang Heribert von Dalberg.

Marriage and regency
Marianne married Count Franz Georg Karl Anton von der Leyen und zu Hohengeroldseck (1736-1775). After the death of her husband, she was regent of the County of Hohengeroldseck during the minority of her son Philip Francis, Prince of Leyen from 1775 to 1793.  As the age of legal majority was twenty-five, she legally ruled until 1791, but as her son showed no interest to take over the affairs of state, she was able to continue her regency until the invasion and occupation of Revolutionary France in 1793.

Escape and death
After the French invasion, she managed to escape from the county dressed as a maid servant. She left a French-language description of her escape from the French, which became famous. She died in 1804.

References 

1746 births
1804 deaths
German memoirists
18th-century women rulers
18th-century German politicians
People of the French Revolutionary Wars